Chhappad Phaad Ke is a 2019 Indian Hindi-language comedy film directed by Sameer Hemant Joshi, produced and bankrolled by Yoodlee films, film division of Saregama with Vinay Pathak, Siddharth Menon, Ayesha Raza Mishra and Sheetal Thakur in lead roles for Hotstar Specials. The story revolves around a middle class family, who is low on finances but high on morals and how their life takes a turn when they find a bag full of money. It began streaming exclusively on Hotstar from 18 October 2019.

Synopsis 
Chhappad Phaad Ke is satire on the consumerism and hypocrisy in people's lives set in the Maharashtrian family named Gupchups headed by Sharad Gupchup (Vinay Pathak) who is morally upright. The movie revolves around the family when they found an unaccounted cash of five crores going down with ethical crisis in determining the right thing to do with the family desires and aspirations coming in way.

Cast 
 Vinay Pathak as Sharad Atmaram Gupchup
 Siddharth Menon as Shubham Gupchup 
 Ayesha Raza Mishra as Vaishali Gupchup
 Sheetal Thakur as Ketaki Gupchup
 Madhav Vaze as Atmaram Gupchup
 Mayur Khandge as Wasim Tamboli 
 Sandeep Mehta as Pramod
 Anuj Sullere as Paresh
 Vineet Sharma as Ravi
 Anjali Atre as Varsha
 Shekhar Lohakare as Ramakant Ghuge
 Mahesh Kulkarni as Mahendale
 Prabhakar Daool as Auto Driver
 Vishwas Sahastrabuddhe as Dadasaheb MLA

Production 
The filming was done in early 2019 with Vinay Pathak joining the sets in March 2019 and wrapped filming in April 2019 at Pune.

Soundtrack 

Songs and background score composed by Prashant Pillai.

Release 
It started streaming exclusively on Hotstar from 18 October 2019 under its label Hotstar Specials marking it as the first film to stream exclusively on the platform.

Reception 
The film received a mediocre response from critics. Hina Beg writing for The Quint said, "Chhappad Phaad Ke is a twisted comedy that tries too hard and lost what the point which it is trying to make under the developments". Swetha writing for the Hindustan Times wrote, "Despite having lined up brilliant actors like Vinay Pathak and Ayesha Raza, debutant director Sameer Joshi offers a film that is neither entertaining nor hard-hitting." Prathyush writing for Film Companion said, "Hotstar’s first original film, is an over-referenced, under-articulated story of middle-class aspirations, greed, and political ambitions."

References

External links 
 

2010s Hindi-language films
Disney+ Hotstar original films
Indian comedy films
Hindi-language comedy films
2019 direct-to-video films
2019 films
2019 comedy films